El Anatsui ([ah-nah-ch-wee], born 1944) is a Ghanaian sculptor active for much of his career in Nigeria. He has drawn particular international attention for his "bottle-top installations". These installations consist of thousands of aluminum pieces sourced from alcohol recycling stations and sewn together with copper wire, which are then transformed into metallic cloth-like wall sculptures. Such materials, while seemingly stiff and sturdy, are actually free and flexible, which often helps with manipulation when installing his sculptures.

Early life and education

El Anatsui was  born in Anyako, in the Volta Region of Ghana. The youngest of his father's 32 children, Anatsui lost his mother and was raised by his uncle. His first experience with art was through drawing letters on a chalkboard. He trained at the College of Art, University of Science and Technology, in Kumasi in central Ghana. One of his early influences was sculptor Vincent Akwete Kofi.  

His work with sculpture and wood carving started as a hobby to keep alive the traditions he grew up with. He began teaching at the University of Nigeria, Nsukka, in 1975, and has become affiliated with the Nsukka group.  It has taken many years to find artists who can occupy a prominent place on the global circuit while choosing to reside outside the metropolitan centres. William Kentridge has made his reputation from Johannesburg, and El Anatsui has conquered the planet while living and working in the Nigerian university town of Nsukka.

Exhibitions

Anatsui's career grew gradually, starting in his home village of Nsukka before branching off to places such as Enugu and Lagos, and eventually internationally. In 1990, Anatsui had his first important group show at the Studio Museum In Harlem, New York. He also was one of three artists singled out in the 1990 exhibition "Contemporary African Artists: Changing Traditions", which was extended for five years.
Anatsui has since exhibited his work around the world, including at the Brooklyn Museum (2013); the Clark Art Institute (2011); the Rice University Art Gallery, Houston (2010); the Metropolitan Museum of Art, New York (2008–09); the National Museum of African Art, Smithsonian Institution, Washington, D.C. (2008); the Fowler Museum at UCLA (2007); the Venice Biennale (1990 and 2007); the Hayward Gallery (2005); the Liverpool Biennial (2002); the National Museum of African Art (2001); the Centre de Cultura Contemporània de Barcelona (2001); the 8th Osaka Sculpture Triennale (1995); the 5th Gwangju Biennale (2004); the Arab Museum of Modern Art in Doha (2019); and the Kunstmuseum Bern (2020).
In 1995, Anatsui held his first solo exhibition outside of Africa in London. He expressed a variety of themes and demonstrated how African art can be shown in a multitude of ways that are not seen as "typical" African. His work utilized conceptual modes used by European and American artists but hardly in African countries. Anatsui showed his work at the de Young Museum in San Francisco in 2005. This was his first time "appear[ing] as part of the permanent collection in a major art museum". Also in 2005, his exhibition at New York's Skoto Gallery, "Danudo," was the first display of his metal sheets in an American city. At this gallery, Skoto Aghahowa presented Anatsui's wood wall panels alongside Sol LeWitt's drawings. This exhibition popularized his bottle-cap works as he gained more recognition in the press.

Anatsui was invited to the Venice Biennale in 2006 and again in 2007 where he was commissioned to make two hanging metal tapestries. During the 2007 edition, he exhibited his works at the Palazzo Fortuny which consisted of newly built walls for him to display three metal hangings entitled Dusasa. Each artwork demonstrated different textures and colors including golds, reds, and blacks. The way the bottle tops draped throughout the hangings created a sense of gentleness that made it stand apart from the other works in the gallery. The art curator of the Biennale, Robert Storr, mentions that the artist's series "reaches back into a whole series of things in the postwar period-it has a kind of exaltation I have not seen before". During this Venetian showing, Anatsui wanted to create a new experience for his viewers conceptually. He believes that "human life is not something which is cut and dried. It is something that is constantly in a state of change." At this point, he began to refer his metalworks as hangings instead of "cloths".

A 2010 retrospective of his work, entitled When I Last Wrote to You About Africa, was organized by the Museum for African Art and opened at the Royal Ontario Museum in Toronto, Ontario, Canada. It subsequently toured venues in the United States for three years, concluding at the University of Michigan Museum of Art.

A major exhibition of recent works, entitled Gravity & Grace: Monumental Works by El Anatsui, had its New York premiere at the Brooklyn Museum in 2013. Organized by the Akron Art Museum (exhibition: 2012), the exhibition later traveled to the Des Moines Art Center (2013–14) and the Bass Museum of Art in Miami (2014).

A career-spanning survey of his work, organized by Okwui Enwezor and Chika Okeke-Agulu, entitled Triumphant Scale drew record-breaking crowds when it opened, in March 2019 at Munich's Haus der Kunst. From there, the show travelled to the Arab Museum of Modern Art, in Doha, and later to the Kunstmuseum Bern in 2020.

Other activities
Anatsui was selected to be a member of the International Society for Education through Art (InSEA) world council in 1992 for his work in education. Anatsui was a founding member and fellow of the Forum for African Arts in 2000. That year he also became a member of the International Selection Committee for the Dakar Biennale in Senegal. In 2001 he was a fellow at the Civitella Ranieri Foundation in Italy.

Recognition

Awards
Anatsui won an honorable mention at the First Ghana National Art Competition as an undergraduate student in 1968. The following year he was awarded the Best Student of the Year at the College of Art in Kumasi, Ghana. In 1983 he won a commission for two large public sculptures made of terrazzo-surfaced cement on the Nsukka campus. He was selected to be one of ten artists invited to the Zweites Symposium Nordesekkuste residency in Cuxhaven, West Germany, in 1984.

In 1990, Anatsui was invited to the 44th annual Venice Biennale show 5 Contemporary African Artists, where he received an honorable mention. That year he was included in the American documentary Nigerian Art-Kindred Spirits.

In 2015, the Venice Biennale awarded Anatsui the Golden Lion for Lifetime Achievement. In 2017, Anatsui was awarded the Praemium Imperiale, the first Ghanaian to win this international art prize.

Other awards include:

 1990 – Public Prize, 7th Annual Triennale der Kleinplastik
 1995 – Kansai Telecasting Prize, 6th Osaka Sculpture Triennial
 1998 – Bronze Prize, 9th Osaka Sculpture Triennial
 2008 – Visionaries! Award, Museum of Arts and Design (MAD)
 2009 – Prince Claus Award
 2009 – Artist Honoree, 30th Anniversary Celebration, National Museum of African Art

Honorary degree
 2016 – Honorary doctorate, Harvard University
2017 – Honorary doctorate, Kwame Nkrumah University of Science and Technology

See also
Big 4 (statue)

Footnotes

Further reading
  "EL Anatsui, Tsiatsia", Le Delarge, read online.
 "El Anatsui (born 1944), Sculptor", Benezit Dictionary of Artists, read online, .
 Lisa M. Binder, "Anatsui, El (born 1944), sculptor", Grove Art Online, read online, .
 Ian Chilvers and John Glaves-Smith, "Anatsui, El (1944–)", A Dictionary of Modern and Contemporary Art, read online, .
 Anne Hart Jennifer, "El Anatsui (1944)", Dictionary of African Biography, read online, .
 Simon Ottenberg, New Traditions from Nigeria: Seven Artists of the Nsukka group, Smithsonian Institution Press 1997, 
 
 
 Oguibe, Olu. "El Anatsui: Beyond Death and Nothingness", African Arts, Vol.31, No.1 (1988), pp. 48–55+96, El Anatsui: Beyond Death and Nothingness 
 Gayer, J. (2008). El Anatsui : Gawu. Espace, (86), 39–40. id.erudit.org/iderudit/9058ac

External links
 El-Anatsui.com
 "El Anatsui" at Praemium Imperiale.
 QuickTime Virtual Reality Image of "Akua's Surviving Children" at the Victoria & Albert Museum, London, by Jonathan Greet
 Doug Britt, "El Anatsui lets chance, collaboration into his work", Houston Chronicle, 25 January 2010.
 Inception Gallery Contemporary Art
 El Anatsui piece at the New York Metropolitan Museum of Art
 "El Anatsui", Art21. (n.d.). Retrieved 8 December 2016.
 'The Installation of El Anatsui's "Dusasa l" (The Nelson-Atkins Museum of Art). Retrieved 17 January 2017.

1944 births
Living people
20th-century Ghanaian sculptors
Ghanaian male artists
Male sculptors
21st-century sculptors
Ghanaian artists
Honorary Members of the Royal Academy
Kwame Nkrumah University of Science and Technology alumni
People from Volta Region
Academic staff of the University of Nigeria
21st-century Ghanaian sculptors
Recycled art artists